The 1936 Santa Clara Broncos football team represented Santa Clara University as an independent during the 1936 college football season. In their first season under head coach Buck Shaw, the Broncos compiled an 8–1 record with five shutouts, and outscored all opponents by a combined total of 139 to 36. In the final AP Poll released in late November, Santa Clara was sixth.

The Broncos' victories included a  besting of Stanford, a  victory over Saint Mary's and a  victory over undefeated and second-ranked LSU in the third Sugar Bowl on New Year's Day.

Two Broncos received honors on the 1936 All-Pacific Coast football team: fullback Nello Falaschi (INS-1, UP-1); and guard Dick Bassi (AP-1, INS-1, UP-1).

Schedule

References

Santa Clara
Santa Clara Broncos football seasons
Sugar Bowl champion seasons
College football undefeated seasons
Santa Clara Broncos football